Bill Dubuque is an American screenwriter known for such films as The Accountant, A Family Man, The Judge, and the television series Ozark. In 2017 he scripted an upcoming DC Extended Universe Nightwing film and has been connected to an Accountant sequel.

Biography 
Dubuque was born in St. Louis, Missouri, spending time working on the Lake of the Ozarks as a teen. He still lives in St. Louis, with his wife and three children, with whom he still frequently visits the Lake of the Ozarks.

Before starting as a screenwriter in 2008, Dubuque worked as a recruitment headhunter. He was approached by producer Mark Williams with the rough idea for The Accountant, which Dubuque developed into a script named to the 2011 Black List of the best unproduced screenplays in Hollywood, including doing research to develop the protagonist (played by Ben Affleck) to have high-functioning autism; the film was credited by Autism Speaks for its portrayal of the disorder. The first screenplay of his to be produced, 2012's The Judge, led to Dubuque being recognized as one of Varietys 10 screenwriters to watch and named to the 2012 Black List with 20 mentions.

In 2015, Dubuque successfully pitched an action-adventure called The Real McCoy to Universal Pictures, with Chris Pratt attached to star;  the film is still in production. Another collaboration with Mark Williams, A Family Man, was released in 2016; with a working title of The Headhunter's Calling, the script was based on Dubuque's previous work in recruitment. Dubuque's teenage experiences at an Ozarks resort led him to work again with producer Mark Williams and male lead Jason Bateman on developing the series Ozark, which was released on Netflix in 2017 and quickly renewed for a second season, as well as earning the writing team a Writers Guild of America Award nomination. In April 2019, Dubuque replaced Damian Szifron as the screenwriter for the film adaptation of The Six Million Dollar Man.

Filmography

References

External links
 

Living people
American television writers
Writers from St. Louis
Screenwriters from Missouri
Year of birth missing (living people)